Franz Dominic Grassi (* 11 May 1801 in Leipzig; † 14 November 1880 Leipzig) was a merchant in Leipzig with Italian ancestry family. Through his extensive heritage to the city, it was possible to construct numerous monuments and buildings.

Life 

He was born as son of Franz Josef Grassi (merchant and financier) and his spouse Rossi. The family originate from central Italy and immigrated to Leipzig. After his commercial training and numerous trips abroad, he founded his own trading firm for Russian products, indigo dye and tropical fruits in Leipzig. After the death of his father in 1847, he operated mostly in speculation and exchange business and after the death of his mother in 1854, he retired completely from active commercial life.

Grassi remained a bachelor all his life and was regarded as an original of Leipzig. He was a theater and horse lover, and therefore one of the founders of the Leipzig racing club. He also supported Leipzig citizens, who were in emergency situations. In Leipzig Grassi also popularly called "The Wood Sucker" because of the habit of chewing on a toothpick.

Grassi is buried at the Alter Johannisfriedhof ("Old St. John's Cemetery").

Legacy 

Although Grassi largely considered in his testament even distant relatives, godchildren and servants, he left the city a fortune of 2.327 million Gold Mark (approx. 23 million euro). From this property numerous construction projects, parks and monuments have been supported, some of which were destroyed during World War II (New Gewandhaus and the museums on Augustusplatz. Of the remaining buildings is the Grassi Museum at Johannisplatz, the "Old Grassi Museum" (now Leipzig city library) and the Mendebrunnen mention. Furthermore parts of the money was used for the erection of the Völkerschlachtdenkmal, and the monuments for Johann Sebastian Bach and Johann Wolfgang von Goethe.

Since 2002 the Italian Chamber of Commerce in Germany and the TU Chemnitz endow the "Franz Dominic Grassi Prize" for services to promote the German-Italian trade and economic relations.

References

External links 
Grassi Museum

1801 births
1880 deaths
Businesspeople from Leipzig
German philanthropists
19th-century philanthropists